Michel Celaya (4 July 1930 – 2 January 2020) was a French rugby union player who played at back-row for the France national rugby union team and Biarritz Olympique.

Early life and career 
Michel Celaya was born on 4 July 1930 in Biarritz, France.

Celaya earned his first cap for the France national rugby union team on 28 February 1953. 

He made a total of 50 official appearances for the French national team between 1953 and 1961.

Celaya was part of the French national team that won the Five Nations Championship in 1954, 1955, 1959, 1960 and 1961.

Celaya spent his entire club career at Biarritz Olympique.

Death 
Celaya died at the age of 89 on 2 January 2020 in Biarritz, France.

References

1930 births
2020 deaths
French rugby union players
France international rugby union players
Sportspeople from Biarritz
Biarritz Olympique players
French rugby union coaches
Rugby union flankers